Goormaghtigh theorem may refer to any of various geometry results proved by the French engineer mathematician René Goormaghtigh:
 a generalization of Musselman's theorem
 a generalization of the Droz-Farny line theorem.